Matías Orlando (born 14 November 1991 in Tucumán) is an Argentine rugby union player and Newcastle Falcons player. He plays as a wing and centre.

Orlando plays for Newcastle Falcons in Premiership Rugby since 2020. He previously played for Pampas XV, from 2012 to 2014, in the Vodacom Cup, and for the Jaguares in the Super Rugby from 2016 to 2020.

He has 41 caps for Argentina, since his first game at 40-5 win over Uruguay at 20 May 2012, for the South American Rugby Championship, in Santiago, Chile. He was called for the 2014 Rugby Championship but he never played. He has currently 2 tries scored, 10 points on aggregate.

Orlando was a starter for the  national team on 14 November 2020 in their first ever win against the All Blacks.

References

External links
Matías Orlando at UAR Official Website (Spanish)

1991 births
Living people
Argentine rugby union players
Argentina international rugby union players
Jaguares (Super Rugby) players
Pampas XV players
Rugby union wings
Rugby union centres
Sportspeople from Tucumán Province